Zhang Chengye (born May 20, 1982 in Jilin) is a Chinese biathlete who competed in the 2006 Winter Olympics in both biathlon and cross-country skiing. He is set to compete for China at the 2010 Winter Olympics in Men's biathlon.

References

1982 births
Living people
Biathletes at the 2006 Winter Olympics
Biathletes at the 2010 Winter Olympics
Chinese male biathletes
Chinese male cross-country skiers
Cross-country skiers at the 2006 Winter Olympics
Olympic biathletes of China
Olympic cross-country skiers of China
People from Tonghua
Sport shooters from Jilin
Asian Games medalists in cross-country skiing
Cross-country skiers at the 2003 Asian Winter Games
Asian Games medalists in biathlon
Biathletes at the 2007 Asian Winter Games
Biathletes at the 2011 Asian Winter Games
Asian Games gold medalists for China
Asian Games silver medalists for China
Asian Games bronze medalists for China
Medalists at the 2007 Asian Winter Games
Medalists at the 2011 Asian Winter Games
Skiers from Jilin
21st-century Chinese people